Kjetil Nilsen (born 19 February 1975) is a Norwegian football midfielder.

He started his career in Langhus IL; and later played for Ski IL, Drøbak/Frogn IF and Lillestrøm SK. With Lillestrøm he played in the Norwegian Premier League in 1998, 1999 and 2000. He then played for Skjetten SK and Follo FK.

In February 2009 Nilsen signed as playing assistant coach of Modum FK.

References

1975 births
Living people
Norwegian footballers
Drøbak-Frogn IL players
Lillestrøm SK players
Skjetten SK players
Follo FK players
People from Ski, Norway
Association football midfielders
Sportspeople from Viken (county)